This list of media awards is an index to articles about awards related to the media. 
It includes general media awards and awards for magazines, blogs, podcasting, student and educational media and women in media
It excludes awards that are covered by the following lists:

General

Magazines

Magazine media awards include awards given by magazines for other media, and awards for magazines.

[[The Maggies' Magazine Cover Awards]] a.k.a. ''Maggie(s) Awards''

Blog and podcasting

Blog

Podcasting

Student and educational

Student and educational awards are for media made by or for students.

Women in media

See also

 Lists of awards
 List of media awards honoring women
 Blog award

References

 
 
 
  
 
Media awards honoring women 
Media